The Milwaukee Road's class EP-2 comprised five electric locomotives built by General Electric in 1919.  They were often known as Bipolars, which referred to the bipolar electric motors they used.  Among the most distinctive and powerful electric locomotives of their time, they epitomized the modernization of the Milwaukee Road. They came to symbolize the railroad during their nearly 40 years of use, and remain an enduring image of mainline electrification.

Design
In 1917, following the tremendous success of the 1915 electrification of the Mountain Division, the Milwaukee Road decided to proceed with electrifying the Coast Division.  As part of this project it ordered five new electric locomotives from General Electric for $200,000 apiece.  Their design was radically different from the boxcab locomotives previously provided by General Electric for the initial electrification of the Mountain Division two years earlier.  The Milwaukee Road was the only railroad to order this design of locomotive from GE.

The most remarkable mechanical improvement was arguably the traction motors used on the new locomotives. They were known as bipolar motors, because each of the locomotive's 12 motors had only two field poles, mounted directly to the locomotive frame beside the axle.  The motor armature was mounted directly on the axle, providing an entirely gearless design.  This design was almost entirely noiseless, as it eliminated not only gear tooth growl, but also the whine of higher-RPM electric motors typically used in standard nose-mounted applications.  The EP-2s were not the first electric locomotives to use bipolar motors, which had first been designed by Asa F. Batchelder for the New York Central S-motors over a decade earlier, but at the time they were the largest.

The layout of the bipolars was unusual as well. The locomotive carbody consisted of three sections.  A small center section contained a boiler for heating passenger cars, while the larger end sections contained the locomotive's electrical equipment and operator cabs in distinctive round-topped hoods.  The locomotive's frame was split into four sections, hinged at the joints, with the two middle sections attached to the end sections of the locomotive body.  There were twelve sets of driving wheels, plus a single idler axle at each end, for a 1B-D+D-B1 wheel arrangement.  All buffering forces were transmitted through the locomotive frame.

The bipolars were designed to be able to pull any Milwaukee Road passenger train singly, and were originally delivered without multiple unit controls.

Service history

When the Bipolars were introduced, their modernity and distinctive design made them the most famous of the Milwaukee Road's electric locomotives. They came to symbolize the Olympian, the railroad's premier train from Chicago to Seattle. Their unique appearance and power made them ideal for publicity purposes, and there was a series of demonstrations in which a Bipolar was able to out-pull contemporary steam locomotives.  During a short period of testing on the Mountain Division, the EP-2s were shown to be less expensive to operate than the GE and Westinghouse electric locomotives then in use.

The five EP-2s, numbered 10250-10254, were placed into regular service in 1919 on the Coast Division.  The Milwaukee Road saw immediate cost savings over the steam locomotives previously in use, as the Bipolars could run from Tacoma to Othello without stopping for servicing and could haul trains up grades that had required double-heading steam engines.

The Bipolars operated on the Coast Division from 1919 to 1953, for most of that period without any serious rebuilding.  In 1939 they were renumbered E1-E5.  In 1953 all five of the EP-2s, which were 35 years old and worn out from heavy wartime service, were heavily rebuilt by the Milwaukee Road at a cost of about $40,000 per locomotive.  The rebuild included additional traction motor shunts for increased speed, roller bearings, multiple unit capability, flash boilers, and streamlining. The E5, rebuilt in the Tacoma Shops as the prototype, performed as advertised, but went over budget, so the Milwaukee Shops were tasked with rebuilding the other four Bipolars. Unfortunately the Milwaukee Shop forces, unaccustomed to working on electric locomotives, did a "poor job" in the opinion of Electrification Department Head Laurence Wylie. (Wylie's  successor, T. B. Kirk, stated that he saw a group of disconnected wires in a newly rebuilt EP-2 bundled together and tagged with a written message, "We don't know where these go".) Afterwards the Bipolars were prone to electrical fires and failures, despite repeated attempts by Tacoma Shops to correct them.

Between 1954 and 1957 the Bipolars saw decreased use, and in mid-1957 were transferred off the Coast Division to the Mountain Division. Between 1958 and 1960 all five were gradually retired, by which time they had received the Union Pacific-inspired yellow and gray passenger paint scheme. In 1962 all except for one E2 were towed to Seattle and scrapped.  
Locomotive E2 was donated to the National Museum of Transportation in St. Louis, Missouri in 1962 and moved there that year.  It has remained on static display ever since, and has been fully restored to its appearance immediately after its 1953 rebuilding.

References

 
 
 
 
 

3000 V DC locomotives
EP-2
General Electric locomotives
Passenger locomotives
Electric locomotives of the United States
Preserved electric locomotives
Railway locomotives introduced in 1919
Gearless electric drive
Standard gauge locomotives of the United States